Anil Chaudhary may refer to:
 Anil Chaudhary (umpire)
 Anil Chaudhary (politician)
 Anil Chaudhary (filmmaker)